William Patrick Noonan (14 May 1947 – 30 December 2021) was a professional rugby league footballer who played in the 1960s, 1970s and 1980s. He played for the Linwood Keas, the Canterbury-Bankstown Bulldogs, the Newtown Jets and for the New Zealand national side. He played for Canterbury against Australia as an 18-year-old in 1965. Noonan played in seven games (one Test) on the New Zealand national rugby league team 1967 tour of Australia and in two home Test matches against Australia in 1969. He also represented the South Island, Southern Zone and various age group sides before he was signed by the Bulldogs from the New Zealand Rugby League for a $6,000 transfer fee in 1970. He was Peter Moore's first signing for the Bulldogs. He played for Canterbury-Bankstown in their loss in the 1974 NSWRFL season's grand final.

Background
Bill Noonan was born in New Zealand.

References

1947 births
2021 deaths
Canterbury rugby league team players
Canterbury-Bankstown Bulldogs players
Linwood Keas players
New Zealand national rugby league team players
New Zealand rugby league players
Newtown Jets players
Rugby league hookers
Rugby league players from Christchurch
Rugby league props
South Island rugby league team players